"Like a Fool" is a song written by Yvonne DeVaney, and recorded by American country music artist Dottie West.  It was released in July 1967 as the first single from the album I'll Help You Forget Her.  The song reached number 13 on the Billboard Hot Country Singles chart.

Chart performance

References

1967 singles
Dottie West songs
Song recordings produced by Chet Atkins
RCA Victor singles
1967 songs